Wincenty Leopold Sleńdziński, or Vincas Slendzinskis in Lithuanian (1 February 1838, Skrebinai, Jonava Raion – August 6, 1909, Vilnius) was a Polish-Lithuanian painter, primarily of portraits, in the Realist style.

Biography 
His first art lessons came from his father, the painter . Later, when the family moved to Vilnius, he received piano lessons from Stanisław Moniuszko. In exchange, his father gave drawing lessons to Moniuszko's daughter. His first formal painting instruction came from Kanuty Rusiecki.

In 1856, when admission to the Imperial Academy of Arts proved too difficult, he enrolled at the Moscow School of Painting, Sculpture and Architecture. Three years later, he was able to enter the Academy, where he was awarded a silver medal for his depiction of Daniel in the lions' den. In 1861, he received the title of "Artist", 3rd degree.

Shortly after, he joined a secret movement associated with the "Lithuanian Provincial Committee", an organization seeking independence for Lithuania. Following his participation in the January Uprising, he was arrested. After a short trial, he was sentenced to internal exile in Knyaginino, under strict police surveillance.

In 1867, he was given permission to live in Kharkov, where he stayed until he was allowed to leave in 1872. He then went to Kraków, where he made the acquaintance of Jan Matejko. Later, he went to Dresden, where he lived with Józef Ignacy Kraszewski and his family. It was then that he first made a name for himself as a portrait painter. He also helped restore the paintings at Kórnik Castle. In 1875, after accidentally crossing the Austro-Hungarian border while hiking, he was ordered back to Kharkov.

In 1883, thanks to an Imperial amnesty, he was able to return to Vilnius and married the widow of a local photographer. Once again, in addition to his customary portraits, he engaged in restorative work. He also created religious frescoes at the Church of St. Casimir and several other notable churches, as well as the chapel of Rasos Cemetery.

His son, Ludomir Sleńdziński, also became a well-known painter and art professor.

References

Further reading
 Katarzyna Hryszko, Wincenty Sleńdziński (1837-1909): malarz i zesłaniec, (exhibition catalog) Galeria Sleńdzińskich, 2013

External links

The Galeria Sleńdzińkich in Białystok, home page.
An appreciation of Sleńdziński @ Bernardinai.

1838 births
1909 deaths
19th-century Polish painters
19th-century Polish male artists
Polish portrait painters
Lithuanian people of Polish descent
Lithuanian painters
Religious artists
Fresco painters
People from Jonava District Municipality
Polish male painters
Burials at Bernardine Cemetery
Moscow School of Painting, Sculpture and Architecture alumni